"Open" is a song by the American heavy metal band Queensrÿche. It was released as a single in support of their 2003 album Tribe. This song was featured on the PC port of the 2003 Video Game, True Crime: Streets of LA.

Charts

References 

2003 songs
2003 singles
Queensrÿche songs
Songs written by Chris DeGarmo
Songs written by Geoff Tate
Songs written by Michael Wilton
American hard rock songs